Matthew Adams (born December 12, 1995) is an American football linebacker of the National Football League (NFL). He played college football at Houston.

College career
Adams played four seasons for Houston. He led the Cougars with 82 tackles in 2016 and finished second with 88 in 2017. In his college career, he posted 259 tackles, 21 tackles for loss, and 7.5 sacks.

Professional career

Indianapolis Colts
Adams was drafted by the Indianapolis Colts in the seventh round (221st overall) of the 2018 NFL Draft.

Adams made an appearance in two postseason games, registering one tackle and one special teams stop. On September 26, 2020, Adams was placed on injured reserve with an ankle injury. He was activated on November 7, 2020. He was placed on the reserve/COVID-19 list by the team on November 11, and activated on November 16. In Week 12 against the Tennessee Titans, Adams was ejected from the game after punching Titans' linebacker Nick Dzubnar.

Chicago Bears
On April 9, 2022, Adams signed a one-year contract with the Chicago Bears. He suffered a calf injury in Week 5 and was placed on injured reserve on October 11. He was activated on November 16.

References

External links
Houston Cougars bio

1995 births
Living people
People from Missouri City, Texas
Sportspeople from Harris County, Texas
Players of American football from Texas
American football linebackers
Houston Cougars football players
Indianapolis Colts players
Chicago Bears players